The 2007–08 UCI Africa Tour was the fourth season of the UCI Africa Tour. The season began on 5 October 2007 with the Grand Prix Chantal Biya and ended on 14 September 2008 with the Powerade Dome 2 Dome.

The points leader, based on the cumulative results of previous races, wears the UCI Africa Tour cycling jersey. Hassen Ben Nasser from Tunisia was the defending champion of the 2006–07 UCI Africa Tour. Nicholas White of South Africa was crowned as the 2007–08 UCI Africa Tour champion.

Throughout the season, points are awarded to the top finishers of stages within stage races and the final general classification standings of each of the stages races and one-day events. The quality and complexity of a race also determines how many points are awarded to the top finishers, the higher the UCI rating of a race, the more points are awarded.
The UCI ratings from highest to lowest are as follows:
 Multi-day events: 2.HC, 2.1 and 2.2
 One-day events: 1.HC, 1.1 and 1.2

Events

2007

2008

Final standings

Individual classification

Team classification

Nation classification

Nation under-23 classification

External links
 

UCI Africa Tour

2008 in African sport
2007 in African sport